Hugh de Willoughby was an English medieval theologian and university chancellor.

Hugh de Willoughby achieved a Doctor of Divinity degree. Between 1334 and 1335, he was Chancellor of Oxford University. Between 1347 and 1348, he was Vice-Chancellor of the university.

References

Year of birth unknown
Year of death unknown
14th-century English Roman Catholic theologians
Chancellors of the University of Oxford
Vice-Chancellors of the University of Oxford